The adjutant general of Texas (TAG) is the commander and chief executive officer of the Texas Military Department, the executive department of the Texas Military Forces. The adjutant general's position of authority over Texas Military Forces is second only to the commander-in-chief, the governor of Texas. This position is analogous to the United States secretary of defense. The adjutant general of Texas is appointed by the governor of Texas with the advice and consent of the Texas Senate from Texas Government Code Title 4, Subtitle C, Chapter 437.003.

The Constitution of Texas vests all military authority in the commander-in-chief, an elected position, to maintain civilian control of the military. It is impractical for the governor of Texas to operate the military themselves, so their command authority is delegated via commission to the adjutant general. The adjutant general, secretary of state, attorney general, and comptroller are generally regarded as the most important executive positions in the Government of Texas.

History 
Texas Military Forces were established in 1835 in concurrence with the Texas Revolution. The War Department, headed by the Secretary of War, was established by the 1st Congress of the Republic of Texas on August 5, 1836, which included the Texas militia, Texas Army, Texas Navy, Texas Rangers, and Office of the Adjutant General first held by Colonel Albert Sidney Johnston from August 5, 1836 to November 16, 1836.

When Texas joined the United States, the Texas Army and Texas Navy were integrated into the United States Armed Forces. The War Department was re-designated the Department of Texas and the Secretary of War position was abolished. The Adjutant General position was elevated to run the department, which now Office of the Adjutant General, Texas militia, and Texas Rangers. The department was abolished from February 4, 1856 to April 6, 1860 due a fire on October 10, 1855 that destroyed nearly all records.

The department was again abolished from January 1, 1867 to June 24, 1870 during the military occupation and reconstruction of Texas. After Texas was readmitted to the United States on March 30, 1870, the department was reestablished. It comprised the Office of the Adjutant General, Texas militia and Texas State Police (Texas Rangers). Following the Militia Act of 1903, the Texas militia became the Texas National Guard. During World War I, the Department of Texas was re-designated the Adjutant General Department and again maintained provincial "Home Guard" forces for defense of the state while the Texas National Guard was under federal command. By 1935, the Texas Rangers had evolved from a paramilitary force to a police force and were reorganized under the Texas Department of Public Safety. During World War II, the United States Congress amended the National Defense Act of 1916 permanently authorizing the "Home Guard" defense forces as the Texas State Guard. The Adjutant General Department was colloquially referred to as the "Texas Military" from 2006 to 2015. On October 28, 2015 the Adjutant General Department was officially rebranded as the Texas Military Department.

Powers and functions

Office of the Adjutant General 
The Office of the Adjutant General (OAG) is the general and their deputy's (mainly) civilian staff.

OAG is the principal staff element of the Adjutant General in the exercise of policy development, planning, resource management, fiscal and program evaluation and oversight, and interface and exchange with other Texas Government departments and agencies, foreign governments, and international organizations, through formal and informal processes. OAG also performs oversight and management of Texas Military Forces.

Awards and decorations 

 The Texas Adjutant General's Individual Award, is the eighth highest military decoration that may be awarded to a service member of the Texas Military Forces.
 The Texas Adjutant General’s Certificate of Commendation
 The Texas Adjutant General’s Certificate of Appreciation

List of adjutants general 
*Military ranks at time of office:

See also 

 Texas Military Forces
 Texas Military Department
 List of conflicts involving the Texas Military
 Awards and decorations of the Texas Military
 United States Secretary of Defense

References 

Texas Military Department
Texas Military Forces